The National Memory Institute is a Slovak public institution that holds the police records of the fascist Slovak State and communist Czechoslovak Socialist Republic regimes that ruled Slovakia during the twentieth century. The institute also promotes research into these periods of Slovak history and educates the general public of this history. The founder of the institute was Ján Langoš, who served as director until his death in a car crash in 2006.

See
The Institute had 7 sees since its establishment, currently located at Miletičova Street 19 in Bratislava. In December 2021 it was announced that the by 2026, the Institute should relocate to newly modernised and reconstructed buildings at Krížna Street in Bratislava, where a library and an exposition were to be opened to the public.

Controversy
One of the institution's staff historians, was fired in 2016 for promoting the Slovak State.

Academic opinion
James Mace Ward commented that the National Memory Institute "has done a brisk trade in publications on the Slovak state, much of this scholarship being of high quality. Yet the focus on the state seems disproportionate, as the institute’s archive has few  relevant  holdings".

Political scientist Jelena Subotić states that after Langoš' death, "The Institute’s main goal became the delegitimization of Slovakia’s communist regime, achieved by grouping it together with fascism while making a case that communist dictatorship was, in fact, worse."

References

Further reading

Historiography of Slovakia
Commemoration of communist crimes
Holocaust commemoration
2003 establishments in Slovakia